Barnet Museum is in the London Borough of Barnet.  It has displays on topics including the Battle of Barnet, Barnet Fair and Barnet Market. It is a centre for local and family research and its archives, library and reference collection are available for use by members of the public.

Description
The museum was founded in 1938, and it remains in its original home an early Georgian house in the heart of High Barnet. Its collection of objects, photographs, maps, books and documents - donated by local people and organisations - helps to preserve and celebrate Barnet's heritage.

It is a registered charity and is run entirely by volunteers from the Barnet and District Local History Society (originally the Barnet Record Society). The Museum hosts many guided visits for groups and local schools.

The Museum's public opening hours are: Tuesday, Wednesday and Thursday 2.30pm to 4.30pm; Saturday 10.30am to 4.00pm and Sunday 2.00pm to 4.00pm.  Guided visits are arranged for when the Museum is closed to the public.  Admission is free.

Collections
The museum has permanent exhibitions on the following:
 The Battle of Barnet
 Archaeology – mainly medieval finds on display
 Domestic items – mainly from the 20th Century
 Costume – ladies dresses, bonnets and lace
 Public houses and the coaching trade in Barnet
 Local businesses – Watsons Microscopes, the Barnet Ventilator (credited with saving Elizabeth Taylor when she was young)
 Services, Hospital and Fire Service
 The Home Front in Barnet during World War II
 Schooling in Barnet
 Victorian Room

See also
Gillian Gear

References

External links

 Barnet Museum
Barnet Society

Museums established in 1938
Museums in the London Borough of Barnet
Local museums in London
Fashion museums in the United Kingdom
1938 establishments in England
Chipping Barnet